Calvisius Rufus was a governor of Britannia Inferior, a province of Roman Britain during the reign of Severus Alexander (AD 222 and 235). It is unclear whether his governorship precedes or succeeds those of Claudius Apellinus and Valerius Crescens Fulvianus. Little else is known of him, although an inscription records his remodeling of a building at Old Penrith.

References 

Roman governors of Britain
Ancient Romans in Britain
3rd-century Romans
Rufus